Gary Wheeler (born 30 September 1989) is an English professional rugby league footballer who last played as a  or  for Barrow Raiders in the RFL League 1, and has played for the England Knights at international level.

He previously played for St Helens (Heritage No. 1171), Warrington Wolves and Toronto Wolfpack in the Super League.

Background
Wheeler was signed from Blackbrook ARLFC where he represented England at U-15 and U-16s, plus toured Australia in 2006 with the winning Saints Academy side.

Career

St Helens
Wheeler made his professional début for St Helens in the Challenge Cup against the London Skolars on 20 April 2008 at Knowsley Road where St Helens won 56–0.

He played in the 2011 Super League Grand Final defeat against Leeds at Old Trafford.

Warrington Wolves
On 22 October 2014, Wheeler signed a two-year contract to play for the Warrington Wolves.

Toronto Wolfpack
On 26 July 2016, Wheeler signed a contract to play for the Toronto Wolfpack in Canada from 2017.
On 10 March 2020 it was announced that Wheeler had left Toronto by mutual consent

Barrow Raiders
On 24 June 2021 it was reported that he had signed for Barrow in the RFL League 1
On 27 October 2022, it was reported that he had left the club

International career
In 2012 he was selected to play a match for the England Knights.

In 2013 he was selected for the senior England RL squad

References

External links

Toronto Wolfpack profile
Profile at warringtonwolves.com
(archived by web.archive.org) St Helens profile
Profile at saints.org.uk

1989 births
Living people
Barrow Raiders players
England Knights national rugby league team players
English rugby league players
North Wales Crusaders players
Rochdale Hornets players
Rugby league players from St Helens, Merseyside
Rugby league centres
Rugby league five-eighths
St Helens R.F.C. players
Toronto Wolfpack players
Warrington Wolves players